Katutura is a 2015 Namibian action/drama film directed by Florian Schott about the hard life in Katutura, a township in Windhoek, the capital of Namibia.

Synopsis

Katutura follows a group of characters experiencing the gravity of living in a township. Ex-convict Dangi has to deal with living a law-abiding life, an extramarital son and an old flame who his wife doesn't know about. Gangster Shivago explores a new market to sell his drugs and Kondja, a teenager in a wheelchair who helps street kids, falls in love for the first time. Their paths intertwine and their lives collide in both hopeful and brutal ways.

Katutura deals with the struggle of everyday life in the township. There is crime, drug abuse, violence, but it also shows the strength of the community as well as the bustling creativity in the place otherwise known as the place where we do not belong.

Festivals
2016
 Pan African Film Festival
 Helsinki African Film Festival – Finland
 Ecrans Noirs Film Festival – Cameroun
 African Film Festival Trinidad and Tobago

Cast
 Elizabeth: Mara Baumgartner
 Shivago: Obed Emvula 
 Nancy: Whilzahn Gelderbloem
 Foibe: Tjuna Kauapirura
 Esme (as Odile Mueller): Odile Müller 
 Ndapewa: Kandi Shejavali
 Gary: Jacobs Shivute
 Dangi: Chops Tshoopara
 Kondja: Gift Uzera
 Mouton: Armas Shivute

References

External links 
 
Katutura Official Facebook Site
Katutura Trailer on Youtube
Katutura at Rushlake Media

2015 films
Namibian drama films
2010s English-language films